Vaccination against COVID-19 in Portugal started on 27 December 2020.

The Government of Portugal appointed a task force on 18 November 2020 to develop the COVID-19 Vaccination Plan. The COVID-19 Vaccination Plan Task Force was formalised on 23 November 2020. It was led by Francisco Ramos, former Undersecretary of State and Health, and composed of military personnel, technicians from the Shared Services of the Ministry of Health (SPMS), the General Directorate of Health and Infarmed. In 30 days, on 18 December, the task force presented the plan, which divided the vaccination into three phases, according to the priority of the people to be vaccinated.

Approval of vaccines within the European Union is done by the European Medicines Agency (EMA), and the first COVID-19 vaccine, Tozinameran from Pfizer/BioNTech, was approved on 21 December 2020. In concert with other EU countries, Portugal began vaccination on 27 December, followed by vaccination of healthcare professionals directly in contact with COVID patients. The first Portuguese to be vaccinated was António Sarmento, director of the infectious diseases department at the Hospital de São João.

Portugal stands out internationally as one of the countries with the highest percentage of vaccinated population: with data as of 11 October 2021 88% of the country's total population has received the first dose. Portugal also has the highest level of COVID-19 vaccination within the European Union as of the end of September 2021.

Vaccines on order 
There are several COVID-19 vaccines at various stages of development around the world.

References 

2021 in Portugal
Healthcare in Portugal
Portugal
COVID-19 pandemic in Portugal